Simon Hall may refer to:

 Simon Hall (chemist), professor of chemistry at the University of Bristol
 Simon Hall (murderer), killer who for years claimed innocence only to go on to confess
 Simon Hall (writer), BBC correspondent and novelist
 Simon J. Hall, urologist